This is a list of media in Fredericton, New Brunswick.

Television

 Channel 4.1 (cable 3): CBAT-DT, CBC (licensed to Saint John, with studios in Fredericton)
 Channel 9.1 (cable 8): CKLT-DT, CTV (Saint John)
 Channel 11.1 (cable 6): CHNB-DT, Global (Saint John; semi-satellite of CIHF-DT Halifax)

Radio
 1260 AM - CKHJ, "Pure Country" country music
 90.5 FM - CJPN-FM, French language community
 92.3 FM - CFRK-FM, "New Country 92.3" country
 93.1 FM - CIHI-FM, "Rewind 93.1" classic hits
 93.3 FM - CIRC-FM, automated local information (defunct)
 94.7 FM - CJRI-FM, gospel music
 95.7 FM - CKTP-FM, mixed format, owned by the St. Mary's First Nation
 96.5 FM - CIXN-FM, "Joy FM"  Contemporary Christian music
 97.9 FM - CHSR-FM, University of New Brunswick & St. Thomas University campus/community radio
 99.5 FM - CBZF-FM, CBC Radio One
 105.3 FM - CFXY-FM, "Bounce 105.3" adult hits
 106.9 FM - CIBX-FM, "Move 106.9" adult contemporary

CBC Music (CBZ-FM 101.5) and both Radio-Canada services (Ici Radio-Canada Première CBAF-FM-1 102.3 and Ici Musique CBAL-FM-4 88.1) are provided from transmitters in Saint John. Other stations from Saint John and Presque Isle, Maine can also be heard in Fredericton.

Print

The Daily Gleaner is published in Fredericton as a city daily and there are also three weekly newspapers available. The Telegraph-Journal, based in Saint John, publishes a provincial edition and has a bureau in Fredericton. Moncton's Times & Transcript operates a news bureau from the Legislative Press Gallery. Furthermore, the students at the University of New Brunswick and St. Thomas University both publish their own weekly papers - The Brunswickan and The Aquinian respectively - which are distributed in public areas on campus and in the city in general.  In recent years, Fredericton has seen a growth in alternative and independent media newspapers.

Online
 https://nouzie.com/ - NouZie is for the community by the community. NouZie is free to view and free for posting stories and is funded by local advertising.

Fredericton
 
Media, Fredericton